Iván Ezequiel Silva (born 22 January 1994) is an Argentine professional footballer who plays as a central midfielder for Super League Greece 2 club Panachaiki.

Career
Newell's Old Boys became Silva's first senior club 2014, he made his professional debut on 25 October during a draw against Godoy Cruz. He subsequently made six first-team appearances over the course of 2014, 2015 and 2016 for Newell's Old Boys. In July 2016, Silva joined Primera B Nacional's Argentinos Juniors on loan. He went on to make three appearances in the club's promotion-winning campaign of 2016–17. He returned to Newell's Old Boys in July 2017, but was soon loaned out again to Primera B Nacional side Guillermo Brown. He scored on his debut, in a 3–0 win over Flandria on 8 October.

Brown was Silva's third career loan destination, with him joining the Primera B Nacional outfit on 23 July 2018. He remained for two years, appearing in twenty-eight fixtures and scoring one goal; versus Defensores de Belgrano.

Career statistics
.

Honours
Argentinos Juniors
Primera B Nacional: 2016–17

References

External links

1994 births
Living people
People from Rosario Department
Argentine footballers
Association football midfielders
Argentine Primera División players
Primera Nacional players
Newell's Old Boys footballers
Argentinos Juniors footballers
Guillermo Brown footballers
Club Atlético Brown footballers
Club Cipolletti footballers
Boca Unidos footballers
Sportspeople from Santa Fe Province